Argo is a Canadian manufacturer of amphibious all-terrain vehicles. It was founded in 1962 as Ontario Drive and Gear (ODG) Limited, in Kitchener, Ontario and was later moved to New Hamburg, Ontario. Argo offers 6×6 and 8×8 amphibious extreme terrain vehicles, as well as 4 wheel ATVs.

History
Founded in 1962 in Kitchener, Ontario. ODG helped design the transmission for the Amphicat. ODG manufactures 8×8 vehicles and 6×6 vehicles for recreational and industrial use.

In November 2009, volunteers in twelve communities in Nunavut were each equipped with an Argo Avenger, one of ODG's 8×8 vehicles, for local Search and Rescue.

Recently, ODG was asked to help the Canadian Space Agency in designing a lunar vehicle.

The Argo is an all-terrain 8×8 or 6×6 amphibious ATV / UTV / XTV. ODG has been manufacturing the Argos for over five decades.

Technical details
 8×8 and 6×6
 Triple differential ADMIRAL steering transmission provides even torque to all 8 of the 25" Argo tires.
 Hydraulic vented disc brakes
 Front and rear axle bearing extensions
 One-piece handlebar steering control with mounted brake lever.
 Amphibious
 Aftermarket parts available

See also
 Terrapin (amphibious vehicle)

References

External links

 
  (in Russian)

Companies based in the Regional Municipality of Waterloo
Truck manufacturers of Canada
Eight-wheel drive